Georgy Demidov (November 29, 1908 – February 19, 1987) was a Russian political prisoner and writer.

Born in Saint Petersburg to a working-class family, Demidov showed technical and engineering gifts at an early age and was thought to be a future physicist. From 1929 to 1931 he was imprisoned for political crimes. In the winter of 1938, he was arrested in Kharkiv, where he was working and studying at the Kharkov Electrotechnical Institute, after being served a summons for an internal passport check. It was a check that was to last eighteen years. His interrogator threatened to arrest Demidov's wife, and orphan his five-month-old daughter. Demidov confessed and was sentenced as a Trotskyist, but did not accuse anyone else, and was sent to corrective labor camps.

For fourteen years he served in the Kolyma region of Siberia, ten in the most brutal of conditions. In 1946, he received a second sentence, after which he sent a telegraph to his wife that was in the form of an official telegraph informing her of his death. In the main camp hospital, Demidov became acquainted and then a friend to a hospital assistant, the future writer Varlam Shalamov.

On March 20, 1958, Demidov was rehabilitated by the Supreme Court of the USSR.

In August 1980 his entire corpus of work was seized.

In July 1988, due to the order of Alexander Nikolaevich Yakovlev, a secretary in the Central Committee of the Communist Party of the Soviet Union, the seized documents were returned to his daughter.

He wrote several stories on labor camp themes, two of which were published in Novy Mir (1997, Volume 5, pp. 116–145) – "People Die for Metal" ("Люди гибнут за металл") – a title drawn from a statement of Mephistopheles in 'Faust' by 'Goethe' –   and "The Artist Baccilla and his Wonders" ("Художник Бацилла и его шедевр"). Unlike other writers of the camps, Demidov remains comparatively unknown and untranslated.

In 2008, on the centenary of his birth, his stories, collected by his daughter, were published in book form as "Чудная планета" (Miraculous Planet) by Возвращение press.

References
 Demidov biography  at Belousenko.com
 Demidov  at Booksite.ru
 Demidov profile  at Magazines.russ.ru
 Biography by his daughter 
 Biography by the Sakharov Museum  
 Demidov books  

1908 births
1987 deaths
Russian male short story writers
Writers from Saint Petersburg
National University of Kharkiv alumni
Georgy
20th-century philanthropists